Iglesia Dinamarquesa of San Telmo (in English: Danish Church of San Telmo) is a Christian temple located in the neighborhood of San Telmo, city of Buenos Aires. It was the work of the Danish architect Morten Rönnow, who completed the construction in 1931.

References

External links 
iglesiadanesa.com.ar

Christianity in Buenos Aires
Buildings and structures in Buenos Aires
20th-century Lutheran churches